Joe Powell (21 March 1922 - 30 June 2016) was a British stuntman and actor. He was known as the "daddy of British stuntmen".

Early life and career 
Powell was born in Shepherd's Bush, London. He joined the British Army and served in the 1st Battalion Royal Fusiliers Cadet Corps. He enjoyed soldiering, and soon after the outbreak of war, when he was still only 17, he joined the Grenadier Guards. To break the monotony of drill and PT he took up boxing with the regimental team, but as the war progressed he was selected for No 4 Special Service (Commando) unit, taking part in the 1942 raid on Dieppe, during which he was briefly knocked out, and in the D-Day invasion. In 1946 he met with the actor Dennis Price which led to him getting a job as an extra at Pinewood Studios. He was sparring at the London's Polytechnic Boxing Club and soon became a founding partner in a stunt team by Captain Jock Easton. Powell performed stuntwork in many films, including The Guns of Navarone (1961), The Longest Day (1962), Cleopatra (1963), Zulu (1964) and Those Magnificent Men in Their Flying Machines (1965). He also participated in several James Bond films. He is listed by The Guardian as having performed one of the 10 best film stunts ever.

Personal life and family
Powell was twice married, first to Marguerite and after to Juliet. Powell is survived by four sons and a daughter. He was the brother of Eddie Powell, also a film stuntman.

Publications 
Powell also published a book on his life known as The Life and Times of a Fall Guy.

References

External links
 

1922 births
2016 deaths
Male actors from London
British male television actors
English stunt performers